The Virtuoso String Quartet was a British quartet, founded by the Gramophone Company (better known as HMV) in 1924, being the first such quartet established specifically for recording. In effect they displaced the Catterall Quartet from their position recording for HMV.

Marjorie Hayward led them for the 15 years of their life. Raymond Jeremy and Cedric Sharpe previously performed in the Philharmonic Quartet.

Personnel
 Marjorie Hayward, first violin
 Edwin Virgo, second violin
 Raymond Jeremy, viola
 Cedric Sharpe, cello

Concerts

1926/10: The first Bradford Festival of Chamber Music.  Brahms sextet op36; Schoenberg Verklärte Nacht

1926/12/11: St. Martin-in-the-Fields. Debussy quartet G minor; Mozart quartet in E flat (K.v. 428) 

1927/6: Wigmore Hall, London. John B. McEwen: Three quartets

1927/10: Second Bradford Festival

1927/9/28, 1927/10/12&26: Aeolian Hall, London

1927: Wigmore Hall, London. Bax: Quartet 2, Oboe quintet, Piano quintet

1928/3/13, Town Hall, Chelsea: Chelsea Music Club 36th concert

1928/6/15: Aeolian Hall, London. John B. McEwen: Quartet in C Minor, first performance; Arnold Bax; York Bowen.

1928/10/23: Town Hall, Oxford: Ravel

1928/11/22: Town Hall, Oxford

1930/3/26 Wigmore Hall: Bax

1930 As part of the Celtic Congress, University College concert hall, London; concert included work by John McCormack, the Welsh soprano Megan Foster, and the cellist, Beatrice Harrison

Acoustic recordings (4 sets; all premiere recordings)
Beethoven: no 8, E minor (Op. 59/2): late 1924

Tchaikovsky Quartet 1 in D, Op. 11: 1923

Franck: String Quartet in D: Premiere recording (1925)

Bridge Three Idylls: 1923.

Electrical recordings (6 sets and some singles)
Ravel: quartet; Introduction and Allegro with John Cockerill, harpist.

Borodin: Nocturne

Debussy: Quartet G minor

Beethoven: No.9 in C Op.59/3

Beethoven: No.6 in Bb Op.18/6.

Glazounov: Orientale: 1928

Thomas: Mignon Gavotte 1928; HMV B 2784

Press notices
"From the London station [BBC] we have had many good things during the past month, the pick being the Virtuoso Quartet in Mozart and Debussy…"

"Good as these Budapest party records are [Haydn op76/1, HMV D1075-7], they are beaten all round by those of the Virtuoso Quartet in Debussy's G minor… For vividness and sonority this is surely among the finest achievements of the [Gramophone] Company".

"… distinguished themselves as virile performers of Beethoven… put up so excellent a show [in Ravel]"

References

British string quartets
Musical groups established in 1924